Edwin Howard (April 6, 1896 – January 18, 1982) was an American architect. His work was part of the architecture event in the art competition at the 1932 Summer Olympics.

References

1896 births
1982 deaths
20th-century American architects
Olympic competitors in art competitions
People from St. Louis